, there were about 23,000 electric vehicles registered in Pennsylvania.

Government policy 
, the state government's official policy goal is to have 100% of all new vehicle sales be electric by 2035.

, Pennsylvania offers tax rebates of up to $1,000 for electric vehicle purchases.

, electric vehicles are subject to a tax of $0.0172 per kilowatt-hour of electricity of used.

, there were 64 electric vehicles in the state fleet.

Charging stations 
, there were 1,203 public charging stations in Pennsylvania.

The Infrastructure Investment and Jobs Act, signed into law in November 2021, allocates  to electric vehicle charging stations in Pennsylvania.

Public opinion 
A 2022 poll conducted by Centrist Democrats of America of Pennsylvania voters showed that 6% of respondents were "very likely" to purchase an electric vehicle in the next two to three years.

By region

Erie 
, there were 210 electric vehicles registered in Erie County.

Philadelphia 
, there were 108 public charging stations in Philadelphia.

In 2022, EVgo announced a partnership with the city to support electrification of its entire municipal fleet.

Pittsburgh 
In November 2021, the Allegheny County Police Department introduced an electric vehicle, becoming the first police department in Pennsylvania to do so.

References 

Pennsylvania
Road transportation in Pennsylvania